Sunset is an EP which was released by American solo artist Pete Yorn in 2000.

Track listing
All tracks composed by Pete Yorn
"For Nancy"
"Sleep Better"
"Closet"
"Life on a Chain"
"Strange Condition"

2000 EPs
Pete Yorn albums
Columbia Records EPs